Shukur Nariman oğlu Hamidov (1 April 1975 – 22 October 2020) was an Azerbaijani officer, national hero and colonel of the Armed Forces of Azerbaijan. He was son to Nariman and Shargiya Hamidov. He was an enlisted member of the army since a young age and had experienced multiple wars. His family were refugees from Armenia that later migrated to Azerbaijan. 

Shukur Hamidov was an attributed soldier with multiple accolades and awards to his name and his legacy follows him with his name being immortalised in the Qubadli district along with a school being named after him in the same country. 

His relations include Zakir Hasanov, the President of Azerbaijan Ilham Aliyev, late Polad Hashimov and Mais Barkhudarov & Khudayar Yusifzade others.

Biography 
Shukur Hamidov was born in the Qubadli District of Azerbaijan SSR. He was the 9th child in the family of Nariman & Shargaya Hamidov. His father gave him the name of his own father. 

Since 8th class Shukur Hamidov devoted himself to the army. Firstly, he graduated Jamshid Nakhchivanski Military Lyceum, then the High Military School in Baku. Hamidov served for more than 20 years.

His elder brother was involved in the first Nagorno-Karabakh war.

On the night from 1st to 2 April 2016 Armenian–Azerbaijani clashes took place along the line of contact in Nagorno-Karabakh and surrounding territories to the south.  On 5 April, a mutual ceasefire agreement was reached. Lieutenant colonel Shukur Hamidov distinguished himself during the capture of the Lalatapa height near Çocuq Mərcanlı village of Jabrayil District.
On 19 April 2016 Azerbaijani President Ilham Aliyev signed orders on awarding honorary titles, orders and medals to a group of Azerbaijani military servicemen who "have distinguished exceptional bravery and heroism while preventing the Armenian military provocations on the contact line of troops and repelling the enemy’s attacks on civilians from April 2 to 5". Shukur Hamidov was awarded the medal of National Hero of Azerbaijan.

List of Armed Conflicts
 2008 Mardakert Skirmishes
 2010 Nagorno-Karabakh clashes
 2010 Mardakert clashes
 2012 Armenian–Azerbaijani border clashes
 2014 Armenian–Azerbaijani clashes
 April War
 Gyunnyut clashes
 July 2020 Armenian–Azerbaijani clashes
 2020 Nagorno-Karabakh war

On 10 May 2016, during the visit of Azerbaijani defense minister Zakir Hasanov to military units in the frontline lieutenant colonel Shukur Hamidov for his bravery during the capture of Lalatapa height in early April, was prematurely promoted to the rank of colonel.

Honours 
  Azerbaijan for the Fatherland Medal Ribbon
  Azerbaijan for Liberation Medal Ribbon
  Azerbaijan for Liberation Medal Ribbon
  Azerbaijan for Liberation Medal Ribbon
  (2001) — Jubilee medal "10th anniversary of the Armed Forces of the Republic of Azerbaijan" 
  Azerbaijan Democratic Republic Jubilee medal 100 years
  (2005) — Medal "For impeccable service" III degree
  (2008) — Jubilee medal "90th anniversary of the Armed Forces of the Republic of Azerbaijan"
  (2010) — Medal "For impeccable service" II degree
  (2013) — Jubilee medal "95th Anniversary of the Armed Forces of Azerbaijan"
  (2015) — Medal "For impeccable service" I degree
  (2016) — National Hero of Azerbaijan
  (2018) — Jubilee medal "100th anniversary of the Azerbaijani Army"
  - Gold Star Medal of Azerbaijan

Short Film
Aprel yüksəkliyi (2018) - Azərbaycanın Milli Qəhrəmanı Şükür Həmidov

Shukur Hamidov National Hero of Azerbaijan Milli Qəhrəman Şükür Həmidov

Death 
On the 22nd October 2020, Hamidov was shot and killed during the Lachin offensive, of the 2020 Nagorno-Karabakh conflict.  

A commemoration ceremony was held on the 1st of April, 2021.

References 

1975 births
2020 deaths
National Heroes of Azerbaijan
Azerbaijani military personnel
2016 Nagorno-Karabakh clashes
People from Qubadli District
Azerbaijani military personnel killed in action
Azerbaijani Land Forces personnel of the 2020 Nagorno-Karabakh war
People killed in the 2020 Nagorno-Karabakh war
Recipients of the Azerbaijan Democratic Republic 100th anniversary medal